The Ministry of Agriculture is a central body within the Government of Kazakhstan. Its current minister is Erbol Qaraşukeev.

Function
The Ministry deals with the basic forms of agriculture such as the formation and implementation of the state agrarian and regional policy, strategic plans, state and other programs and projects in the regulated sphere, namely in the field of agriculture, agriculture, fisheries and water management, protection of reproduction and use of flora and fauna, especially protected natural territories and issues of rural development, agriculture, seed production and regulation of the grain market, state support for compulsory insurance in crop production, protection and plant shelter, veterinary medicine, manufacturing in the field of food production. The formation of the foundations for creating competitive agricultural commodity production, ensuring food security and mobilization readiness. Ensuring state control, supervision and management in the regulated sphere, with the exception of the areas of forestry, hunting, fisheries and water management, specially protected natural areas and rural development issues, Informing and consulting support for the agro-industrial complex.

Structure 
Committees:

 Committee of Water Resources (transferred to the new ministry in 2019);
 Committee of Forestry and Animal World (transferred to the new ministry in 2019);
 Committee of Land Management; 
 Committee of Veterinary Control and Supervision; 
 Committee of the State Inspectorate in the Agro-Industrial complex. 
Departments:

 Department of International Cooperation;
 Department of Mobilization Preparation;
 Department of Strategic Planning and Analysis;
 Department of Internal Audit;
 Department of Production and Processing of Livestock Products;
 Department of Production and Processing of Crop Products;
 Department of Transboundary Rivers;
 Department of Veterinary, Phytosanitary and Food Safety;
 Department of Investment Policy;
 Department of Legal Service;
 Department of Personnel and Administrative Supervision;
 Department of Financial Support; 
 Department of Protection of Public Secrets; 
 Department of Public Relations;  
 Department of Development of State Services and Digitalization.

List of ministers

References 

Agriculture
1991 establishments in Kazakhstan
Ministries established in 1991